Dobromani is a village in the municipality of Trebinje, Republika Srpska, Bosnia and Herzegovina. It is the place where the roots of Rajko Tomović, Serbian scientist. He worked programs in robotics, information technologies in medicine, bio-medical engineering, rehabilitation engineering, artificial organs, and many other important disciplines.

References

Villages in Republika Srpska
Populated places in Trebinje